Grammesia is a genus of moths of the family Noctuidae.

Species
Grammesia trigrammica Hilbn.

Grammesia trilinea Bork.

References
Natural History Museum Lepidoptera genus database

Hadeninae